Period Piece: A Cambridge Childhood is a 1952 autobiographical memoir by the English wood engraver Gwen Raverat covering her childhood in late 19th-century Cambridge society.  The book includes anecdotes about and illustrations of many of her extended family (see Darwin–Wedgwood family).

As the author explains in the preface it is "a circular book" and although it begins with the meeting of her parents (Sir George Darwin and Maud du Puy) and ends with Gwen as a student at The Slade, it is not written chronologically, but rather arranged in a series of fifteen themed chapters, each dealing with a particular aspects of life. The book is illustrated throughout with wood engravings by the author.

The book is dedicated to her cousin Frances Cornford.

It was originally published by Faber & Faber in 1952 in hardback and as a paperback in 1960.  It was reviewed in The Times and by David Daiches in The Manchester Guardian

Period Piece has been translated into Danish (1980), Swedish (1985) and German (1991).

Family trees 

The author's immediate family consisted of her father, Sir George Darwin, her mother, Lady Maud Darwin, and their four children; Gwen and her younger siblings Charles Galton Darwin, Margaret, and William "Billy".  At the very beginning of the book, two family trees are given, one for the author's mother and one for her father.  The family trees are reproduced here with minor modification:

Mother's family tree

Father's family tree 

The author's father was Sir George Darwin.  Her father had a large extended family.  Gwen's grandfather, Charles Darwin died before Gwen's birth, but his wife Emma Darwin ("Grandmama") lived until 1896.  Charles and Emma had seven children who survived to adulthood - four uncles and two aunts to Gwen.  All bar one of the uncles and aunts were married, and two uncles had children, resulting in five cousins:

Uncles
 William Erasmus Darwin ("Uncle William")
 Sir Francis Darwin ("Uncle Frank")
 Leonard Darwin ("Uncle Lenny")
 Sir Horace Darwin ("Uncle Horace").

Aunts
 Henrietta Litchfield ("Aunt Etty")
 Elizabeth ("Aunt Bessy").

Uncle's and aunt's spouses
 Sara (née Sedgwick - "Aunt Sara") - William's wife
 Richard Buckley Litchfield ("Uncle Richard") - Aunt Etty's husband
 Ellen (née Crofts, "Aunt Ellen") - Frank's second wife
 Elizabeth (née Fraser, "Aunt Bee") - Leonard first wife
 Mildred Massingberd - Leonard's second wife
 The Hon. Ida née Farrer ("Aunt Ida") - Horace's wife.

(Note: Florence Henrietta Darwin, Frank's third wife is briefly mentioned but the marriage was after the time period in the book).

Cousins
 Bernard Darwin (son of Frank by his first wife Amy Ruck)
 Frances (daughter of Frank and Aunt Ellen)
 Erasmus Darwin IV (son and eldest child of Horace and Ida)
 Ruth (elder daughter of Horace and Ida)
 Nora (younger daughter of Horace and Ida)

Second cousins

Although not in the trees drawn in the book, the following second cousins are also mentioned:
 Ralph Wedgwood
 Felix Wedgwood (brother of Ralph)
 Ralph Vaughan Williams

Chapter synopses

References

1952 non-fiction books
British autobiographies
Culture in Cambridge
Faber and Faber books